Minorca is an unincorporated community and census-designated place (CDP) in Concordia Parish, Louisiana, United States. As of the 2010 census it had a population of 2,317. It is located in northeastern Concordia Parish, bordered on the east by the city of Vidalia.

U.S. Routes 84 and 425 pass through the northern part of the CDP, leading east through Vidalia  to Natchez, Mississippi, and northwest  to Ferriday. The Mississippi state line, following a former channel of the Mississippi River, is directly north of Minorca.

Demographics

2020 census

As of the 2020 United States census, there were 2,156 people, 667 households, and 409 families residing in the CDP.

References

Census-designated places in Concordia Parish, Louisiana
Census-designated places in Louisiana
Census-designated places in Natchez micropolitan area